This Filthy World is a one-man show/documentary film by John Waters concerning his origins in the trash genre and his successful career navigating Hollywood. It was filmed at the Harry DeJour Playhouse in New York City in 2006.

Synopsis
Jeff Garlin films a performance of Waters' one-man show. The filmmaker talks for an hour and a half about different subjects that made him into who he is today while standing on a stage decorated with a pile of trash, some roses, and a confessional. Waters starts off by talking about his earliest negative influences. He then begins talking about directors of the macabre that inspired him on what to do with his films. He then talks about filmmaking experiences on each and every one of his films and tells stories about some of the Dreamlanders. He discusses sexual fetishes, court trials he has visited, how to make books cool again, and more. The last topic he speaks of is his hometown of Baltimore and all the things he has experienced there.

Cast
 John Waters as himself

Reception
This Filthy World received positive reviews, currently holding an 86% "fresh" rating on Rotten Tomatoes. On Metacritic, the film has a 68/100 rating, indicating "generally favorable reviews".

References

External links
 
 
 
 

2006 films
2006 comedy films
2006 documentary films
American comedy films
American documentary films
Documentary films about film directors and producers
Films set in New York City
Films shot in New York City
John Waters
Stand-up comedy concert films
2000s English-language films
2000s American films